Aplec  was a Catalan magazine from which there is only published one number from April 1952. It was edited by “Club de Divulgació Literària” (a literary club) and it was printed in “Gràfiques Marina, S.A.”.  The editing office was in Joseó Antonio Street, 218. Regarding its format, it had a measurement of 270x215 mm. The number cost 7 pesetas.

It was a literary magazine, really well illustrated. It contained collaborations from J.Mettra, Octavi Saltor, Aurora Bertrana, Salvador Espriu, Maria Aurèlia Capmany, P. Prat i Ubach, Josep Gudiol, Rosa Ricart and Josep Iglésies.

References

External links
 Digitalization available in the ARCA Portal (archive of antique Catalan magazines)

1952 establishments in Spain
1952 disestablishments in Spain
Catalan-language magazines
Defunct literary magazines published in Europe
Defunct magazines published in Spain
Literary magazines published in Spain
Magazines established in 1952
Magazines disestablished in 1952
Magazines published in Catalonia